Sangi Takht or Sang‐e‐Takht, is a district in Daykundi Province in central Afghanistan. It was created in 2005 from  Daykundi district.

The Sangtakht-Bandar District has 290 villages. This district is limited by the Ghor Province and the Ashtarlay District of Daikundi.

The people of Sangtakht-Bandar District are typically farmers. This district lacks an asphalt road and its government office does not have the building.

A few villages in the district are Santakht, Bandar, Seyahchob, and Dorob.

References 

Districts of Daykundi Province
Hazarajat